Frederik Christian Eilschov (13 February 1725 – 15 October 1750) was a Danish philosopher. He is most noted for  Fruentimmer-Philosophie (1749) and for  Philosophiske Breve (1748).

Eilschov was born at Rynkeby on the island of Funen. He was the son of parish priest Laurids Christian Eilschou (1695-1764) and Cathrine Munderlov (1690-1766). In 1742 he became he began his education and 1746 he took received his  master's degree from the University of Copenhagen. He resided at Borchs Kollegium for the remainder of his life.   Eilschov  died at the age of 25 of smallpox and was buried in the cemetery at  Trinitatis Church in Copenhagen.

Works
Cogitationes de scientiis vernacula lingua docendis cum specimine terminologiae vernaculae, 1747
Philosophiske Skrifter, 1747
Philosophiske Breve over adskillige nyttige og vigtige Ting, 1748
Fruentimmer Philosophie i tre Samtaler,  1749

References

1725 births
1750 deaths
People from Kerteminde Municipality
University of Copenhagen alumni
Danish philosophers
Burials at Trinitatis Church